Ifigenia is a tragic opera in one act by Ildebrando Pizzetti, who also wrote the libretto with . The libretto is in Italian language. It was premiered as a radio broadcast from RAI Auditorium in Turin on 3 October 1950. In the same year, it received the first prize of Prix Italia radio annual award, that was held in Turin. The opera made its theatrical debut at Teatro Comunale in Florence on 9 May 1951 during the 14th Maggio Musicale Fiorentino festival.

Roles

Synopsis
The background is presented by a narrator: the gods were angry with the Greeks, have imposed King Agamennone to sacrifice his daughter, Ifigenia, as a condition for his fleet to gain fair winds for the Greek ships bound for Troy. Ifigenia and her mother, Clitennestra were invited by Agamennone, believing that they were preparing for marriage ceremony between her and Achille. Upon arrival, Achille unveiled the truth to them, showing firmness towards the divine will.

The king is relentless, beyond the wrath of the gods, he also fears the rebellion of the soldiers impatient to set sail. He calls upon Ifigenia and urges her to face the terrible trial with courage. The girl accepted her fate and surrender to the altar of sacrifice.

In the epilogue, when the mist descending to hide the sacrificial act is thinned out, a mysterious voice rises to ask why the eternal perpetuation of the war. But there was no answer, and the same voice, after the intervention of the choir, which symbolically multiplies the painful question in several languages "Why? Pourquoi? Por qué? Warum? Why? Quare?", and chanting the prayer in Latin "Si iniquitates observaveris, Domine, quis substinevit?, irascaris, Domine. Dona nobis pacem" for all the victims and perpetrators.

Recordings

References

Operas by Ildebrando Pizzetti
Italian-language operas
1950 operas
Operas
One-act operas
Agamemnon
Operas based on classical mythology